Mark Andrew Burke (born 3 September 1969 in Sydney, Australia) is an Australian squash player. , he resides in Petegem-aan-de-Schelde, Belgium.

Burke played squash professionally from 1997 to 2004. He achieved his highest World Tour ranking of 97 in January 2002. He represented Belgium (dual nationality) from 2009 to 2013 at the European Team Championships.

Burke operates a coaching business, Burkesquash.com.

References

External links
 

1969 births
Sportspeople from Sydney
Australian male squash players
Belgian male squash players
Living people
Sportsmen from New South Wales